Lord Frederick John FitzRoy (4 April 1823 – 12 February 1919) was a British Liberal Party politician.

FitzRoy was the son of Henry FitzRoy and Mary Caroline FitzRoy (née Berkeley. In 1853, he married Catherine Sarah Wilhelimna Wescomb, daughter of William Wescomb, and they had five children, one son and four daughters, including: Anne Ethel (1859–1939) and Evelyn (1860–1924).

FitzRoy was elected Liberal MP for Thetford at a by-election in 1863—caused by the succession of his brother William FitzRoy to 6th Duke of Grafton—and held the seat until 1865 when he stood down to seek election in South Northamptonshire, where he was unsuccessful.

FitzRoy was also a Justice of the Peace for Sussex and Northamptonshire, and a Colonel in the Grenadier Guards.

References

External links
 

UK MPs 1859–1865
1823 births
1919 deaths
Liberal Party (UK) MPs for English constituencies